Holostrophus is a genus of polypore fungus beetles in the family Tetratomidae. There are seventeen described species in Holostrophus.

Species
These five species belong to the genus Holostrophus:
 Holostrophus bifasciatus Say, 1824
 Holostrophus diversefasciatus
 Holostrophus orientalis Lewis, 1895
 Holostrophus koreanus Jung & Seung, 2022
 Holostrophus toyoshimai

References

Further reading

External links

 

Tenebrionoidea
Articles created by Qbugbot